Justin Canale (April 11, 1943 – October 11, 2011) was an American collegiate and professional football player who played offensive lineman for five seasons in the American Football League (AFL), for the Boston Patriots and Cincinnati Bengals. He also played with the Montreal Alouettes of the Canadian Football League, winning a Grey Cup championship in 1970. Canale came back to play two seasons for the Memphis Southmen of the World Football League.

Justin Canale died on October 11, 2011 in Memphis, TN.  He was one of six brothers who played college football at Mississippi State or at the University of Tennessee.  His brother Whit Canale, also a former AFL player.

See also
 Other American Football League players

References

External links
 2011-2010 Pro Football Deaths
 Justin Canale's photo

1943 births
2011 deaths
American football offensive linemen
Boston Patriots players
Cincinnati Bengals players
Memphis Southmen players
Mississippi State Bulldogs football players
Montreal Alouettes players
Players of Canadian football from Memphis, Tennessee
Players of American football from Memphis, Tennessee
American Football League players